Calumet Park is a 198-acre (79-hectare) park in Chicago, Illinois. It provides access to Lake Michigan from the East Side neighborhood on the city's Southeast Side. The park contains approximately 0.9 miles (1.5 km) of lake frontage from 95th Street to 102nd Street. The park is listed on the National Register of Historic Places.

History
Calumet Park is named after the Calumet River and the Calumet Region of southeast Chicago and northwestern Indiana drained by the river. The Olmsted Brothers, a noted firm of urban landscape architects, drew up initial plans for landscaping the proposed new park; however, as a result of the swelling population of the East Side and a consensus that the original plans were inadequate, further land acquisitions were made, the Olmstead plans were revised, and facilities were built.

There are lakefront beaches at 96th, 98th, and 99th Streets.

The park was listed on the National Register of Historic Places in August 2003. On October 4, 2006, the fieldhouse became a Chicago Landmark.

State line
The junction of the Illinois–Indiana border with the shoreline of Lake Michigan stands close to the southern tip of Calumet Park. Only feet offshore from the park's beaches, the artificial line separating the jurisdictions of the two states continues northward into the lake.

References

Parks in Chicago
Beaches of Cook County, Illinois
South Side, Chicago
Lake Michigan
Parks on the National Register of Historic Places in Chicago
Borders of Illinois
Borders of Indiana
Urban public parks
1905 establishments in Illinois
Chicago Landmarks